Max Orrin (born 13 May 1994) is an English professional golfer.

Orrin was born in Margate, Kent. He played on the 2013 Walker Cup team, then turned professional in 2013.

Orrin played on the Challenge Tour in 2014 and won the penultimate tournament of the season, the National Bank of Oman Golf Classic.

Professional wins (5)

Challenge Tour wins (2)

Pro Golf Tour wins (1)

French Tour wins (2)

Team appearances
European Boys' Team Championship (representing England): 2011, 2012
Jacques Léglise Trophy (representing Great Britain & Ireland): 2012
European Amateur Team Championship (representing England): 2013 (winners)
Walker Cup (representing Great Britain & Ireland): 2013

See also
2016 European Tour Qualifying School graduates

References

External links

English male golfers
European Tour golfers
People from Birchington-on-Sea
1994 births
Living people
People from Margate